Polsby is a surname. Notable people with the surname include: 

Daniel D. Polsby (born 1945), American legal scholar 
Nelson W. Polsby (1934–2007), American political scientist

See also
Polsby–Popper test, a mathematical compactness measure